KLWR-LP (105.3 FM) was a radio station licensed to Powell, Wyoming, United States. The station was owned by Living Word Ministries.

On September 2, 2014, the station's owners surrendered its license to the Federal Communications Commission, at which time it was cancelled.

References

External links
 

LWR-LP
LWR-LP
Radio stations established in 2003
Defunct radio stations in the United States
Radio stations disestablished in 2014
Defunct religious radio stations in the United States
2003 establishments in Wyoming
2014 disestablishments in Wyoming
LWR-LP